"The Art of Shredding" is a song by the American heavy metal band Pantera. It was released in 1990 on their sixth studio album Cowboys from Hell, and is the twelfth and final song on the album.

Background
The song was composed in the key of D minor. Vocalist Phil Anselmo's voice ranges in pitch from Bb4 to G6. "The Art of Shredding" is an example of Pantera changing sound from their 1980s glam metal style.

It was the first song that Pantera wrote for the album.

Reception
In the book The Rough Guide to Rock, Peter Buckley wrote that the song's riffs gave Metallica "a run for their money".

Metal Hammer ranked "The Art of Shredding" the 23rd best Pantera song. They wrote: "An avalanche of jagged, churning riffs met Anselmo's rallying cry of 'It's only emotion!' and metal was noisily reborn."

Guitar World ranked "The Art of Shredding" the 10th best Pantera song, writing  that "with its rollercoaster ride of whiplash riffs and rhythms", it is one of the most enjoyable songs from Cowboys from Hell. They also wrote: "Dimebag tops off the proceedings with a gonzo, whammy-filled solo that ably demonstrates that shredding is, in fact, very much an art."

Odyssey rated the song 4.5/5. They thought that it was an excellent way to end the album, while praising its solo.

Personnel
Phil Anselmo – vocals
Diamond Darrell –  guitars
Rex Brown – bass
Vinnie Paul – drums

References

1990 songs
Pantera songs
Songs written by Dimebag Darrell
Songs written by Vinnie Paul
Songs written by Phil Anselmo
Songs written by Rex Brown